Tell Kazel is an oval-shaped tell that measures  at its base, narrowing to  at its top.

Links to ancient Sumur

The tell was first surveyed in 1956 after which a lengthy discussion was opened by Maurice Dunand and Nassib Saliby identifying the site with the ancient city variously named Sumur, Simyra or Zemar (Egyptian Smr Akkadian Sumuru or Assyrian Simirra). The ancient city is mentioned in the Bible, Book of Genesis and 1 Chronicles as the home of the Zemarites, an offshoot of the Caananites. It was a major trade center and appears in the Amarna letters; Ahribta is named as its ruler. It was under the guardianship of Rib-Hadda, king of Byblos, but revolted against him and joined Abdi-Ashirta's expanding kingdom of Amurru. Pro-Egyptian factions may have seized the city again but Abdi-Ashirta's son Aziru recaptured the city.

Excavations

The tell was first excavated between 1960 and 1962 by Maurice Dunand, Nassib Saliby and Adnān Bounni who determined a sequence between the Middle Bronze Age through to the Hellenistic civilization. The most important occupations were determined to have taken place during the Late Bronze Age and Persian Empire.

In 1985, new excavations began in partnership between the Archaeological Museum of the American University of Beirut and the Directorate-General of Antiquities and Museums in Syria under the directorship of Leila Badre. A large amount of imported pottery from Cyprus, known as Cypriot bichrome ware, was found dating between the 14th and 12th centuries BC and contrasting to other sites in the Homs gap. The city was destroyed during the Late Bronze Age, after which local Mycenaean ceramics, Handmade burnished ware and Grey ware replaced the imported pottery. Architectural remains at the site include a palace complex and temple that were dated towards the end of the Late Bronze Age. The temple contained a variety of amulets, seals and glazed ware that showed similarities with the culture of Ugarit. A later Iron Age settlement was detected between the 9th and 8th centuries BC which was brought to an end with evidence of burnt destruction caused by a currently unidentified Assyrian invasion. A warehouse and defensive installation made out of ashlar blocks were found dating to the Persian period with further evidence of Hellenistic occupation evidenced by a large cemetery in the northeast of the site.

See also

Cities of the ancient Near East

References

Further reading

 Dunand, Maurice, Bounni, A. and Saliby, N., Fouilles de Tell Kazel: Rapport préliminaire, AAAS 14, pp. 3–22, 1964.
 Sapin, Jean., Archäologische und geographische Geländebegehung im Grabenbruch von Homs, AfO 26, pp. 174–176, 1978–1979.
 Elayi, Josette., Les importations grecques à Tell Kazel (Symyra) à l'époque perse, AAAS 36-37, pp. 132–135, 1986–1987.
 Badre, L., Gubel, E., al-Maqdissi, M. and Sader, H. [1990], "Tell Kazel, Syria. Excavations of the AUB Museum, 1985–1987. Preliminary Reports", Berytus 38, pp. 9–124, 1990.
 Badre, Leila et al., Tell Kazel, Syria. Excavations of the AUB Museum 1985-1987 - Preliminary Reports", Berytus 38, pp. 55–86, 1990.
 Stieglitz, Robert R., The Geopolitics of the Phoenician Littoral in the Early Iron Age, BASOR 279, pp. 9–12, 1990 and "The City of Amurru", JNES 50.1, pp. 45–48, 1991
 Badre, Leila., Tell Kazel. Rapport Préliminaire sur les 4ème-8ème Campagnes de Fouilles (1988–1992), Syria 71 (1994), pp. 259–359, 1994.
 Badre, L. and Gubel, E., Tell Kazel, Syria. Excavations of the AUB Museum, 1993–1998. Third Preliminary Report, Berytus 44, pp. 123–203, 1999–2000.
 Badre, Leila., Beirut and Tell Kazel: Two New Late Bronze Age Temples, in Proceedings of the First International Congress of Near Eastern Archaeology, 2001.
 Badre, Leila., Handmade Burnished Ware and Contemporary Imported Pottery from Tell Kazel", in Stampolidis, N.Ch. and Karageorghis, V. (eds), Sea Routes ... Interconnections in the Mediterranean 16th-6th Centuries BC. Proceedings of the International Symposium held at Rethymnon, Crete, in September 29-October 2, 2002, Athens, pp. 83–99, 2003.
 Capet, E., Tell Kazel (Syrie). Rapport préliminaire sur les 9e-17e campagnes de fouilles (1993–2001) du musée de l'Université américaine de Beyrouth. Chantier II", Berytus 47, pp. 63–121, 2003.
 Badre, L., Boileau, M.-C., Jung, R., Mommsen, H., The Provenance of Aegean- and Syrian-Type Pottery Found at Tell Kazel (Syria), Ä&L 15, pp. 15–47, 2005.
 Badre, Leila., Tell Kazel-Simyra: A Contribution to a Relative Chronological History in the Eastern Mediterranean during the Late Bronze Age, BASOR 343, pp. 65–95, 2006.

External links
 Wikimapia - Tell Kazel archaeological site

Bronze Age sites in Syria
Phoenician cities
Great Rift Valley
Archaeological sites in Tartus Governorate